= LCDR =

LCDR may refer to:

- London, Chatham and Dover Railway
- Lieutenant commander, a commissioned officer rank in many navies
